E.A.C.I. (La Empresa Asociativa Campesina de Isletas) was a Honduran football club, based in Olanchito, Honduras.

They played their home games at the  Estadio San Jorge although they were formed in Isletas.

History
The club played two seasons in the Honduran national league from 1986 to 1988.

Achievements
Segunda División
Winners (1): 1985

See also
Football in Honduras

References

Defunct football clubs in Honduras